Coleshill is a village and civil parish in the Vale of White Horse district of Oxfordshire, England. Coleshill was part of Berkshire until the 1974 boundary changes transferred it to Oxfordshire. The village is beside the River Cole, which forms both the western boundary of the parish and also the county boundary with Wiltshire. The village is on the B4019 road that links the two towns. The 2011 Census recorded the population of the parish as 156.

Toponym
The toponym "Coleshill" is derived from the Old English kollr, meaning "head", "top" or "hill". It may be that the river was named after the hill, and then "hill" was added as a suffix to "Cole".  The earliest known record of it is Colleshyll in a Saxon will dated 950. The Domesday Book of 1086 records it as Coleselle and Coleshalle. A document dated 1220 and included in the Book of Fees records it as Coleshull. Coleshull and Colleshulle were used from the 14th to the 16th century, before the current form came to be used.

Coleshill estate
The National Trust Coleshill Estate is in the parish. In the Second World War, Coleshill House, on the estate, was the headquarters of the secret Auxiliary Units, who were to resist Nazi German forces if the United Kingdom were invaded. Coleshill House burned down in 1952.

Parish church
The oldest parts of the Church of England parish church of All Saints are late 12th-century; other parts are 13th-century and the tower is 15th-century. The building was refashioned in the 18th century and restored by Street.  In 1708 Abraham I Rudhall of Gloucester cast a ring of five bells for the west tower. In 1884 Mears and Stainbank of the Whitechapel Bell Foundry recast the third bell. In 1938 Mears and Stainbank cast a new treble bell to increase the ring to six.  All Saints is a Grade II* listed building.

Amenities
Coleshill has an 18th-century pub, the Radnor Arms.

Notable people
The record producer Sir George Martin lived at the former rectory until his death in March 2016. His private funeral was held in All Saints parish church.

References

Bibliography

External links

Civil parishes in Oxfordshire
Villages in Oxfordshire